Six Mile Island or Sixmile Island may refer to:

Sixmile Island (Pennsylvania), an alluvial island in Allegheny County
Six Mile Island State Nature Preserve, a national preserve in Kentucky